Who's Laughing Now may refer to:

 Who's Laughing Now (album) (1991), by L.A.P.D.
 "Who's Laughing Now" (Jessie J song) (2011)
 "Who's Laughing Now" (Ava Max song) (2020)
 "Who's Laughing Now", a song by Skinny Puppy (1988)